The 2016 AIBA World Olympic Qualification Tournament for the boxing tournament at the 2016 Summer Olympics in Rio de Janeiro, Brazil, was held between June 16 and June 25, 2016 in  Baku, Azerbaijan.

Medal table

Qualified boxers

   Boxer qualified for the 2016 Summer Olympics

Summary

Results

Light flyweight (49 kg)
The top two boxers will qualify for the 2016 Summer Olympics.

Flyweight (52 kg)
The top four semifinalists and the quarterfinalist who lost to the eventual champion will qualify for the 2016 Summer Olympics.

Section A

Section B

Final

Bantamweight (56 kg)
The top four semifinalists and the quarterfinalist who lost to the eventual champion will qualify for the 2016 Summer Olympics.

Section A

Section B

Final

Lightweight (60 kg)
The top four semifinalists and the quarterfinalist who lost to the eventual champion will qualify for the 2016 Summer Olympics.

Section A

Section B

Final

Light welterweight (64 kg)
The top four semifinalists and the quarterfinalist who lost to the eventual champion will qualify for the 2016 Summer Olympics.

Section A

Section B

Final

Welterweight (69 kg)
The top four semifinalists and the quarterfinalist who lost to the eventual champion will qualify for the 2016 Summer Olympics.

Section A

Section B

Final

Middleweight (75 kg)
The top four semifinalists and the quarterfinalist who lost to the eventual champion will qualify for the 2016 Summer Olympics.

Section A

Section B

Final

Light heavyweight (81 kg)
The top four semifinalists and the quarterfinalist who lost to the eventual champion will qualify for the 2016 Summer Olympics.

Section A

Section B

Final

Heavyweight (91 kg)
The winner will qualify for the 2016 Summer Olympics.

Super heavyweight (+91 kg)
The winner will qualify for the 2016 Summer Olympics.

References

Boxing qualification for the 2016 Summer Olympics
International boxing competitions hosted by Azerbaijan
2016 in Azerbaijani sport
Sports competitions in Baku